This article lists the main sport climbing (also known as competition climbing) competitions and their results for 2019. This includes the World Cup, World Championships, International Climbing Series, Continental Championships.

World Cup

World Championships

Continental Championships

National competitions

Others

References

External links
 International Federation of Sport Climbing Website (IFSC)

 
Sport climbing
2019 in sports
2019 sport-related lists